B. aquaticum may refer to:

Brachybacterium aquaticum, a Gram-positive bacterium
Bupthalmum aquaticum, a flowering plant